Army Group H (Heeresgruppe H), Army Group Northwest (Heeresgruppe Nordwest) after March 1945, was a German army group in the Netherlands and in Nordrhein-Westfalen during World War II.

Army Group H (for Holland) was activated on 11 November 1944 in the Netherlands. It contained the 1st Parachute Army and the 15th Army (in January 1945 replaced by the 25th Army). It garrisoned the Netherlands with twelve divisions. In March 1945 the army group became Heeresgruppe Nordwest (Army Group Northwest) under Ernst Busch the "Oberbefehlshaber Nordwest" (OB Nordwest, the Northwest High Command). After being pushed from the Rhine by Operation Varsity, on 4 May 1945 OB Nordwest capitulated on the Lüneburg Heath to Field Marshal Montgomery.

Commanders

Order of Battle (1944)
 1st Parachute Army
 15th Army

Order of Battle (1945)
 1st Parachute Army
 25th Army
 Armeegruppe Blumentritt
 Wehrmachtsbefehlshaber Dänemark

References

Bibliography

Army groups of the German Army in World War II
Military units and formations established in 1944
Military units and formations disestablished in 1945